Wolfman Mac's Chiller Drive-In is a "horror host" series hosted by "Wolfman" Mac Kelly, which aired Saturday nights at 10 pm from March 14, 2008  to October 29, 2011 on various local television stations in Detroit and on the Retro Television Network nationally. The show typically features vintage sci-fi and horror films like Nosferatu, Teenage Zombies and Night of the Living Dead, enhanced with retro commercials, nostalgic clips, and skits. Each episode is recorded at Erebus Haunted Attraction in Pontiac, MI.

Format

Movies 

The program shows horror and sci-fi movies that are in the public domain such as Night of the Living Dead and Evil Brain from Outer Space.

Characters 

The show is hosted by the titular character, Wolfman Mac, portrayed by Mac Kelly, and his sidekick, Boney Bob, a plastic skeleton purchased from K-Mart.

Both the cast and crew of the show are volunteers and have made appearances at the Motor City Comic Con.

Mac Kelly as Wolfman Mac
Adam Showers as Morbid Melvin
Nina Kircher as Madame Nina
Mark Knote as TORG
Steve Czapiewski as Dr. Valentine
Susan Valenti as Rubella
Karie Nora as Grenadine
Lori Wild as Regan
Dean Vanderkolk as Witch Doctor
Kristina Lakey as Lucy Furr
Dave Ivey as Oscar The Ogre
Mike Murphy as Son Of Froggy
Rick Bobier as Scary Grant
Wally Wojciechowski as Professor M Balmer
Mike Shellabarger as Sheldon the Monster
Jessica Humphrey as Ivana Werkagenn
Sandra Kunz as Scarlett
Shayna Shaw as Jan in the Pan

Host 

Mac Kelly portrays the Wolfman Mac character, which had been a childhood dream of his. Kelly had watched horror hosts such as Count Scary, The Ghoul and Sir Graves Ghastly in his youth. Kelly, as Wolfman Mac, has performed marriage ceremonies and married couples at a haunted house on Halloween. Wolfman Mac has also been the grand marshal for halloween parades, including Armada-Geddon and hosted costume contests for the local city.

Production 

The production crew as well as the cast are amateurs who film the show at the Erebus haunted attraction in Pontiac, Michigan. Guests on the show include local personalities from WRIF and WCSX.

Horror artist, Steve Czapiewski was the lead editor and artist for the show. Steve also produced the show's animated introduction. Musician Mike Shellabarger produced the show's theme song for season 1 and 2.

Comic book artist, Tony Miello, provided artwork for the Chiller Drive-In comic book.

Broadcast 

The show was started by Mac Kelly in July 2007, as Wolfman Mac's Nightmare Sinema on the public access television station in Detroit, Michigan. Kelly had been a fan of Sir Graves Ghastly, a horror hosted television show in Detroit from 1967 through 1982.

In March 2008, the show was picked up by Detroit's MyNetworkTV affiliate, WMYD. At the same time, the show started airing in MyNetworkTV affiliates in Florida.

In November 2009, the show started being broadcast nationally when it was added to the programming schedule on the Retro Television Network.

Kelly announced in January 2013 that the program would cease creating new shows, though networks would still carry the program as reruns. The sets and props were sold at the Erebus haunted attraction in an everything-must-go sale in February 2013.

Episodes 

Wolfman Mac's Chiller Drive-In aired on multiple channels, most with a delayed or completely different schedule. This episode list details the programs as first aired during the show's run from public access to WMYD then to the Retro Television Network.

Season 0 "Nightmare SINema" 

Before the show was called Chiller Drive-In, it went by the name Wolfman Mac's Nightmare SINema. Some host segments and films from this season were revisited in the three seasons Chiller Drive-In.

Season 1 

Season 1 of Wolfman Mac's Chiller Drive-In was the first official season of the show.

Season 2

Season 3

Specials

Reception 

Wolfman Mac's Chiller Drive-In was voted as the Best Local TV Show Other Than a Newscast by readers of the Detroit Metro Times in an October 2008 poll. The Real Detroit Weekly named the show as the Best "Retro" Local TV Program in May 2009.

Controversies 
The show had run for the better part of a year on public access when it moved to WMYD in March 2008. The show was taken off the air after five episodes due to a legal dispute between Mac Kelly and Glenn Kirkland of Darkhaus Sound and Film, the production company for the series. The series returned to the air on May 17 of 2008 after Kelly started Mac Kelly Productions, LLC and removed all the elements that Darkhaus Sound and Film had provided for the show.

References

Bibliography

External links 

 

American television shows featuring puppetry
Local motion picture television series
Culture of Detroit
2007 American television series debuts
Midnight movie television series
Horror movie television series
2011 American television series endings
English-language television shows